Posht Kelan (also Romanized as Posht Kelān; also known as Bāsh Gelān and Peshtgelān) is a village in Horr Rural District, Dinavar District, Sahneh County, Kermanshah Province, Iran. At the 2006 census, its population was 107, in 24 families.

References 

Populated places in Sahneh County